G-10 or garolite is a high-pressure fiberglass laminate, a type of composite material. It is created by stacking multiple layers of glass cloth, soaked in epoxy resin, then compressing the resulting material under heat until the epoxy cures. It is manufactured in flat sheets, most often a few millimeters thick.  

G-10 is very similar to Micarta and carbon fiber laminates, except that glass cloth is used as filler material. (Note that the professional nomenclature of "filler" and "matrix" in composite materials may be somewhat counterintuitive when applied to soaking textiles with resin.)

G-10 is the toughest of the glass fiber resin laminates and therefore the most commonly used.

Properties

G-10 is favored for its high strength, low moisture absorption, and high level of electrical insulation and chemical resistance. These properties are maintained not only at room temperature but also under humid or moist conditions. It was first used as a substrate for printed circuit boards, and its designation, G-10, comes from a National Electrical Manufacturers Association standard for this purpose.

Decorative variations of G-10 are produced in many colors and patterns and are especially used to make handles for knives, grips for firearms and other tools.  These can be textured (for grip), bead blasted, sanded or polished.  Its strength and low density make it useful for other kinds of handcrafting as well.

Hazards 

G-10 is generally safe to handle outside of extreme conditions.

Hazards can result from cutting or grinding the material, as glass and epoxy dust are well known to contribute to respiratory disorders and increase the risk of developing lung cancer. For any work of this kind, the work space should be appropriately ventilated and masks or respirators must be worn.

Epoxy resin is flammable and, once set on fire, will burn violently, giving off poisonous gases. Therefore similar materials like FR-4 containing flame retardant additives have replaced G-10 in many applications.

See also 
 Bakelite

References 

Printed circuit board manufacturing
Fibre-reinforced polymers
Fiberglass